Arthur Hoyt (March 19, 1874 – January 4, 1953) was an American film character actor who appeared in more than 275 films in his 34-year film career, about a third of them silent films.

Career
Born in Georgetown, Colorado, in 1874, Hoyt made his Broadway debut in 1905 in The Prince Consort. He also appeared in Ferenc Molnár's The Devil in 1908, and made his final Broadway appearance in The Great Name in 1911.

Hoyt made the silent comedy short The Scrub Lady in 1914, but his film acting career did not begin in earnest until 1916 when he appeared in another short, The Heart of a Show Girl. From that time until 1944, each year a film was released in which Hoyt had acted – and frequently up to a dozen or so. Hoyt had large roles in such silent films as The Four Horsemen of the Apocalypse (1921), Souls for Sale (1923), and The Lost World (1925). He also directed two silent features, Station Content starring Gloria Swanson and High Stakes, and was the casting director for another, Her American Husband, all in 1918.

Hoyt's final silent film, his 80th, was The Rush Hour (1928), which starred Marie Provost. Unlike her, Hoyt survived the transition to talkies, although he generally played lesser roles such as "a henpecked husband or downtrodden office worker". – and he frequently did not receive screen credit for his performances. His first sound film was 1928's My Man, a musical starring Fanny Brice, and the pace of his work did not slack off in the sound era.  He may be best remembered as the motor-court manager who hassles Clark Gable and Claudette Colbert in Frank Capra's It Happened One Night (1934).

In the 1940s, when he was nearing the end of his career, Hoyt was part of Preston Sturges' unofficial "stock company" of character actors, appearing in all the films written and directed by Sturges from 1940 to 1947.

At the age of 70, Hoyt, who was sometimes billed as "Mr. Arthur Hoyt", retired from acting.  The last film in which he appeared, The Sin of Harold Diddlebock was filmed in late 1944 and early 1945, although it wasn't released until 1947.

Death
Hoyt died at the Motion Picture Country Home in Woodland Hills, California on 4 January 1953, and is entombed in Chapel of the Pines Crematory at Los Angeles, California.

Selected filmography
Silent

The Scrub Lady (1914, Short) - James Olcott - a Friend in Need
The Heart of a Show Girl (1916, Short)
Love Never Dies (1916) - Monsieur Jarnier
A Stranger from Somewhere (1916) - Daniel Darling
The Devil's Bondwoman (1916) - The Alchemist
The Man Who Took a Chance (1917) - James
Perils of the Secret Service (1917) - (Episode #5)
 Bringing Home Father (1917) - Pa Swazey
The Show Down (1917) - Oliver North
Mr. Opp (1917) - Mr. D. Webster Opp
Unto the End (1917)
 The Yellow Dog (1918) - Albert Walker
Cowardice Court (1919) - Lord Cecil Bazelhurst
The Grim Game (1919) - Dr. Harvey Tyson
The Triflers (1920) - Charles Lewiston
The Girl in Number 29 (1920) - Valet
Nurse Marjorie (1920) - Anthony, Duke of Donegal
 The Desperate Hero (1920) - Whitty
Trumpet Island (1920) - Henry Caron
In the Heart of a Fool (1920) - Mortie Sands
A Slave of Vanity (1920) - Croker Harrington
The Four Horsemen of the Apocalypse (1921) - Lieut. Schnitz
 Don't Neglect Your Wife (1921) - Ben Travers
Camille (1921) - Count de Varville
Red Courage (1921) - Nathan Hitch
 The Foolish Age (1921) - Lester Hicks
Too Much Wife (1922) - John Coningsby
Is Matrimony a Failure? (1922) - Mr. Wilbur
 Kissed (1922) - Horace Peabody
 Restless Souls (1922) - Edgar Swetson
The Top of New York (1922) - Mr. Brady
 The Understudy (1922) - Cathbert Vane
Love is an Awful Thing (1922) - Harold Wright
Little Wildcat (1922) - Mr. Wilding
 The Strangers' Banquet (1922) - Morel
The White Flower (1923) - Gregory Bolton
Souls for Sale (1923) - Jimmy Leland (uncredited)
An Old Sweetheart of Mine (1923) - Frederick McCann
 The Love Piker (1923) - Professor Click
To the Ladies (1923) - Tom Baker
 An Old Sweetheart of Mine (1923)
 Do It Now (1924)
Daring Youth (1924) - Winston Howell
 When a Man's a Man (1924) - Professor Parkhill
Bluff (1924) - Algy Henderson
The Dangerous Blonde (1924) - Mr. Faraday
Her Marriage Vow (1924) - Winslow
Sundown (1924) - Henry Crawley
The Lost World (1925) - Prof. Summerlee
Head Winds (1925) - Winthrop Van Felt
The Sporting Venus (1925) - Detective
Private Affairs (1925) - Alf Stacy
Any Woman (1925) - Jones
Eve's Lover (1925) - Amos Potts
The Coming of Amos (1925) - Bendyke Hamilton
The Gilded Butterfly (1926) - Mr. Ralston
The Danger Girl (1926) - Mortimer Travers
Monte Carlo (1926) - Bancroft
The Crown of Lies (1926) - Fritz
The Midnight Sun (1926) - Yessky - Kusmin's Secretary
Eve's Leaves (1926) - Missionary
Footloose Widows (1926) - Henry
Up in Mabel's Room (1926) - Simpson
The False Alarm (1926)
 For Wives Only (1926)
That Model from Paris (1926) - Modeling House Manager
Dangerous Friends (1926) - Frederick Betts
For Wives Only (1926) - Dr. Fritz Schwerman
An Affair of the Follies (1927) - The Inventor
The Mysterious Rider (1927) - King's Secretary
The Love Thrill (1927) - Bragdon
Tillie the Toiler (1927) - Mr. Smythe
Ten Modern Commandments (1927) - George Disbrow
The Rejuvenation of Aunt Mary (1927) - Gus Watkins
Shanghai Bound (1927) - Algy
A Texas Steer (1927) - Knott Innitt
Husbands for Rent (1927) - Waldo Squibbs
Just Married (1928) - Steward
Home, James (1928) - William Waller (floorwalker)
The Rush Hour (1928) - Professor Jones

Sound

My Man (1928) - Thorne
Stolen Kisses (1929) - Hoyt
Protection (1929)
The Wheel of Life (1929) - George Faraker
Say It with Songs (1929) - Mr. Jones
Her Private Affair (1930) - Michael Sturm
Seven Keys to Baldpate (1929) - Professor Boyle (scenes deleted)
Peacock Alley (1930) - Crosby
Seven Days Leave (1930) - Mr. Willings
The Girl Said No (1930) - The Minister (uncredited)
Dumbbells in Ermine (1930) - Siegfried Strong
Night Work (1930) - George Twining (uncredited)
On Your Back (1930) - Victor
Extravagance (1930) - Bridge Playing Guest
The Life of the Party (1930) - Secretary
Along Came Youth (1930) - Adkins
Going Wild (1930) - Robert Story
The Criminal Code (1931) - Leonard Nettleford
The Gang Buster (1931) - Telephone Caller (uncredited)
Inspiration (1931) - Gavarni
Sit Tight (1931) - Mr. Bixby (uncredited)
The Flood (1931) - Uncle George
Young Sinners (1931) - (uncredited)
Gold Dust Gertie (1931) - Dr. Rodman Tate - the Minister
Bought (1931) - Archie (uncredited)
Side Show (1931) - Dr. Martin (uncredited)
Palmy Days (1931) - Man at Seance and at Party (uncredited)
Take 'em and Shake 'em (1931, Short)
Peach-O-Reno (1931) - Secretary
Forbidden (1932) - Martin (uncredited)
The Beast of the City (1932) - Intimidated Witness (uncredited)
Impatient Maiden (1932) - Mr. Thomas
Love in High Gear (1932) - Thaddeus Heath
The Strange Case of Clara Deane (1932) - Mortimer (uncredited)
New Morals for Old (1932) - Art Student (uncredited)
Make Me a Star (1932) - Hardy Powell
Unashamed (1932) - Dr. James W. Osgood (uncredited)
Dynamite Ranch (1932) - Smithers
The Washington Masquerade (1932) - Dinner Guest (uncredited)
Madame Racketeer (1932) - Shiffem (uncredited)
American Madness (1932) - Ives
Devil and the Deep (1932) - Mr. Planet
The All American (1932) - Smythe
The Crusader (1932) - Oscar Shane
Washington Merry-Go-Round (1932) - Willis
Vanity Street (1932) - Albert Kerr- aka Mr. Tidy
The Red-Haired Alibi (1932) - Henri
Madison Square Garden (1932) - Desk Clerk (uncredited)
Call Her Savage (1932) - Mr. Russell - Attorney (uncredited)
20,000 Years in Sing Sing (1932) - Dr. Meeker (uncredited)
No Other Woman (1933) - Bridge Player (uncredited)
The Billion Dollar Scandal (1933) - Masterson's Secretary (uncredited)
Goldie Gets Along (1933) - Mayor Silas C. Simms
Dangerously Yours (1933) - Dr. Ryder
Phantom Thunderbolt (1933) - Eaton's Secretary (uncredited)
The Eleventh Commandment (1933) - Charlie Moore
Daring Daughters (1933) - Hubbard
Pleasure Cruise (1933) - Rollins
Infernal Machine (1933) - Man with Pet Mice (uncredited)
The Cohens and Kellys in Trouble (1933) - Boswell (uncredited)
Man Hunt (1933) - John Harper, Realtor (uncredited)
Emergency Call (1933) - Millionaire's Male Secretary (uncredited)
His Private Secretary (1933) - Little
Heroes for Sale (1933) - Gibson's Secretary (uncredited)
Gambling Ship (1933) - Roger (uncredited)
Bed of Roses (1933) - Hoyt - Paige's Secretary (uncredited)
 Easy Millions (1933)
Laughing at Life (1933) - Businessman
A Shriek in the Night (1933) - Wilfred
Shanghai Madness (1933) - Van Emery
Sing Sinner Sing (1933) - Uncle Homer
Ladies Must Love (1933) - Apartment Manager (uncredited)
Ann Vickers (1933) - Mr. Penny (uncredited)
Curtain at Eight (1933) - Watkins - Night Watchman
Only Yesterday (1933) - Burton, Party Guest (uncredited)
The Chief (1933) - Man at Alderman Meeting (uncredited)
In the Money (1933) - Professor Higginbottom
The Prizefighter and the Lady (1933) - Ringside Fan (uncredited)
The Meanest Gal in Town (1934) - Minor Role (uncredited)
The Ninth Guest (1934) - Osgood's Secretary (uncredited)
The Cat and the Fiddle (1934) - Meek and Humble Man Knocked Down by Lady (uncredited)
It Happened One Night (1934) - Zeke
The Crosby Case (1934) - Wilson (uncredited)
Uncertain Lady (1934) - Superintendent
 Unknown Blonde (1934) - Mr. Vail
Sing and Like It (1934) - Theatre Tickets Buyer (uncredited)
Marrying Widows  (1934)   
Let's Try Again (1934) - Phillips, the Butler
The Notorious Sophie Lang (1934) - Jeweler (uncredited)
Hat, Coat, and Glove (1934) - Mr. James Gardner (uncredited)
The Cat's-Paw (1934) - Reporter (uncredited)
One More River (1934) - Perkins (uncredited)
Springtime for Henry (1934) - Alfred Ordway
Million Dollar Ransom (1934) - Justice of the Peace (uncredited)
Kansas City Princess (1934) - 	Mr. Greenway
Wake Up and Dream (1934) - George Spelvin
Student Tour (1934) - Assistant to Dean (uncredited)
No Ransom (1934) - Grant
When Strangers Meet (1934) - Mr. Peter Peck
I Sell Anything (1934) - Pedestrian Frank Entwistle (uncredited)
I'll Fix It (1934) - School Principal (uncredited)
Jealousy (1934) - Mr. Smith
College Rhythm (1934) - Third Tramp (uncredited)
Babbitt (1934) - Willis Ivans
One Hour Late (1934) - Barlow
Behind the Evidence (1935) - Secretary (uncredited)
Society Doctor (1935) - Hospital Visitor (uncredited)
Murder on a Honeymoon (1935) - Dr. O'Rourke
All the King's Horses (1935) - Henpecked Husband (uncredited)
A Night at the Ritz (1935) - Mr. Hassler
Traveling Saleslady (1935) - Delegate (uncredited)
Vagabond Lady (1935) - Spear Department Head (uncredited)
Let 'Em Have It (1935) - Shoe Store Manager (uncredited)
Ginger (1935) - Parker's Secretary (uncredited)
Chinatown Squad (1935) - William Ward
Love Me Forever (1935) - Sneezing Nightclub Patron (uncredited)
The Raven (1935) - Chapman - Buyer of Poe Memorabilia (uncredited)
Men of Action (1935) - Mr.Evans
Welcome Home (1935) - Titwillow
1,000 Dollars a Minute (1935) - Jewel Store clerk
Bad Boy (1935) - Department Store Manager (uncredited)
Your Uncle Dudley (1935) - Mr. Deepwater (uncredited)
Magnificent Obsession (1935) - Perry
Two in the Dark (1936) - Mr. Pinkley (uncredited)
My Marriage (1936) - Salesman (uncredited)
Song and Dance Man (1936) - Timid Man (uncredited)
Mr. Deeds Goes to Town (1936) - Budington (uncredited)
Gentle Julia (1936) - Mr. Wainwright - Justice of the Peace (uncredited)
Early to Bed (1936) - Smithers
Fury (1936) - Grouch (uncredited)
Poor Little Rich Girl (1936) - Percival Hooch
M'Liss (1936) - Mayor James Morpher
Sing, Baby, Sing (1936) - Mr. Vissinger (uncredited)
Walking on Air (1936) - Mr. Thompson (uncredited)
Lady Luck (1936) - J. Baldwin Hemingway
Don't Turn 'Em Loose (1936) - Judge Bass - Head of Parole Board (uncredited)
15 Maiden Lane (1936) - Neilson - Jeweller's Assistant (uncredited)
Smartest Girl in Town (1936) - The Minister (uncredited)
Pennies from Heaven (1936) - Collector of Taxes (uncredited)
Four Days' Wonder (1936) - George Parracot
Laughing at Trouble (1936) - Sam Turner (uncredited)
Great Guy (1936) - Furniture Salesman (uncredited)
We Who Are About to Die (1937) - Governor's Secretary (uncredited)
Racing Lady (1937) - Racetrack Bettor (uncredited)
Join the Marines (1937) - Capt. James
When You're in Love (1937) - Man with Newspaper and Deaf Wife (uncredited)
Paradise Express (1937) - Phineas K. Trotter
Let's Get Married (1937) - Minister (uncredited)
A Star Is Born (1937) - Assistant Makeup Artist (uncredited)
Ever Since Eve (1937) - Mr. Cuddleton, Hotel Manager
Love in a Bungalow (1937) - A man
Easy Living (1937) - Jeweler (uncredited)
It's All Yours (1937) - Dabney
She's No Lady (1937) - Mr. Douglas
Partners in Crime (1937) - Callahan's Secretary (uncredited)
The Wrong Road (1937) - Beamish, bank teller
Love Takes Flight (1937) - Grey
The Westland Case (1937) - Dr. Shuttle
The Black Doll (1938) - Coroner
Start Cheering (1938) - Librarian
Love on a Budget (1938) - Fred - Chief Councilman (uncredited)
A Trip to Paris (1938) - Chief Councilman (uncredited)
The Devil's Party (1938) - Webster
You and Me (1938) - Mr. Klein (uncredited)
One Wild Night (1938) - McBride (uncredited)
The Rage of Paris (1938) - Assistant Manager (uncredited)
The Sisters (1938) - Tom Selig
Five of a Kind (1938) - Editor Crane's Flunky (uncredited)
Girls on Probation (1938) - Mr. Engstrom
Hard to Get (1938) - Mr. Petewyler (uncredited)
The Cowboy and the Lady (1938) - Valet (uncredited)
Made for Each Other (1939) - Jury Foreman (uncredited)
Sergeant Madden (1939) - Police Prompter (uncredited)
East Side of Heaven (1939) - Loftus (uncredited)
It Could Happen to You (1939) - Alumni Member (uncredited)
Should Husbands Work? (1939) - Roberts
The Man Who Wouldn't Talk (1940) - Little Man (uncredited)
The Great McGinty (1940) - Mayor Wilfred T. Tillinghast
I Love You Again (1940) - Mr. Hines - Floorwalker (uncredited)
Hullabaloo (1940) - Audition Official (uncredited)
Christmas in July (1940) - Mild Juror (uncredited)
The Lady Eve (1941) - Lawyer at Phone in Pike's Office (uncredited)
Million Dollar Baby (1941) - Mr. Fish, Attorney (uncredited)
They Meet Again (1941) - Redmond, Governor's Secretary
Moon Over Her Shoulder (1941) - Daniel Q. Boone Sr. (uncredited)
Marry the Boss's Daughter (1941) - Tired Man (uncredited)
Sullivan's Travels (1941) - Preacher at Revival Mission (uncredited)
Babes on Broadway (1941) - Little Man Entering Nick's (uncredited)
The Palm Beach Story (1942) - Pullman Conductor
Apache Trail (1942) - Meredith - Stage Passenger (uncredited)
My Heart Belongs to Daddy (1942) - Smith, Faculty Member (uncredited)
Keep 'Em Slugging (1943) - Mr. Quink (uncredited)
The Miracle of Morgan's Creek (1943) - McGinty's Secretary (uncredited)
The Great Moment (1944) - Presidential Secretary (uncredited)
Hail the Conquering Hero (1944) - Rev. Upperman (uncredited)
The Sin of Harold Diddlebock (1947) - J.P. Blackstone (final film role)

References

External links

 
 
 
 

1874 births
1953 deaths
Male actors from Colorado
American male film actors
American male silent film actors
Burials at Chapel of the Pines Crematory
People from the Denver metropolitan area
People from Clear Creek County, Colorado
20th-century American male actors